The Aero A.29 was a military biplane developed in Czechoslovakia from the ubiquitous Aero A.11 reconnaissance-bomber. Aero equipped it with floats and it served as a target tug for training anti-aircraft gunners.

Variants
The A.29 was built with two engine types:
Breitfeld & Danek Perun II1927, 5 built.
Walter W-IV1930, 4 built

Specifications (A.29)

See also

A029
1920s Czechoslovakian special-purpose aircraft
Floatplanes
Biplanes
Single-engined tractor aircraft
Aircraft first flown in 1926